Peter Sojčík (born 8 September 1986) is a Slovak professional ice hockey forward who has played over 500 games in the Slovak Extraliga. He currently playing for HK Dukla Trenčín of the Slovak Extraliga.

Career
Sojčík began his career with Dukla Trenčín's academy and made his senior debut for the team during the 2004–05 Slovak Extraliga season. From 2006 to 2011, Sojčík played in the 1st Czech National Hockey League for HC Kometa Brno, SK Horácká Slavia Třebíč, Orli Znojmo and HC Dukla Jihlava.

Sojčík returned to Dukla Trenčín on July 25, 2011 and remained with the team until 2013 when he joined HC Košice. He would then return to Dukla Trenčín for a third spell on December 9, 2015.

Sojčík signed an extension with Dukla Trenčín on July 17, 2020.

Career statistics

Regular season and playoffs

References

External links

1986 births
Living people
People from Dubnica nad Váhom
Sportspeople from the Trenčín Region
Slovak ice hockey forwards
HK Dukla Trenčín players
HK 95 Panthers Považská Bystrica players
HC Kometa Brno players
SHK Hodonín players
SK Horácká Slavia Třebíč players
Orli Znojmo players
HK 91 Senica players
HC Dukla Jihlava players
HC Košice players
Slovak expatriate ice hockey players in the Czech Republic